The Moragahakanda Dam, officially as Kulasinghe Reservoir, is a large gravity dam, and the main component of the larger and more complex Moragahakanda — Kalu Ganga Project, across the Amban River at Elahera, in the Matale District of Sri Lanka. The maiden waters of the dam was released in January 2017.
Morgahakanda/Kaluganga project is the last of the Great Mahaveli project

The larger combined project involves the construction of the Moragahakanda Dam and Reservoir, along with the separate Kalu Ganga Dam and Reservoir, for irrigation and power generation purposes.

A granite Buddha statue built opposite the Moragahakanda reservoir was unveiled on 23 July 2018.

History 
The original Moragahakanda reservoir was first constructed by King Wasaba in 111 AD.

Mahaweli Development programme
According to the Mahaweli Master Plan of 1968, the development of Mahaweli was divided to three projects named A, B and C out of which the last 'C' project was the Moragahakanda Multi-Purpose Reservoir. In 1977 the project was modified and the Accelerated Mahaweli Scheme(AMS) started and was completed in 6 years. However Moragahakanda was not in the AMS. The J.R. Jayewardene Government would later secure funding for the project from Japan but communal violence delayed the project. The construction of the project commenced on 2007 and completed in 2018.

Dam and reservoir 

Two additional embankment saddle dams will also be built to contain the Moragahakanda Reservoir. The reservoir of the Kalu Ganga Dam will be linked via tunnel.

Primary uses

Irrigation 
Water from both, the Moragahakanda and Kalu Ganga reservoirs, will be primarily used to support agricultural needs to an area of at least .

Inland fishing 

Water supply 

Power generation 
Water from the Moragahakanda Reservoir is used to power the  Moragahakanda Hydroelectric Power Station. The substitution of this hydropower with traditional fossil fuel power generation is estimated to save up to  annually. *[This latter claim requires correction, as it is impossible to generate this much power from a 25-megawatt generator in one year. The maximum power possible from a 25-megawatt generator at .06 per kw (wholesale) is $13.14 million (US).]

Roads and bridges 

Rename
On 23 July 2018, under the patronage of president Maithreepala Sirisena, the reservoir has been officially named as Kulasinghe Reservoir, in memory of late Dr. A.N.S. Kulasinghe. Deshabandu Dr. A.N.S Kulasinghe was a Sri Lankan Civil Engineer who served in several projects throughout the country.

See also 

 List of dams and reservoirs in Sri Lanka
 List of power stations in Sri Lanka

References

External links 
 
 

Moragahakanda
Gravity dams
Hydroelectric power stations in Sri Lanka
Buildings and structures in Matale District